23 Live Sex Acts (also referred to as Against Me! and the 23 Live Sex Acts) is the second live album by Against Me! It was recorded on the 2014 tour for their sixth studio album, Transgender Dysphoria Blues and released in 2015.

Track listing

Personnel
Laura Jane Grace – guitar, lead vocals
James Bowman  – guitar, backing vocals
Inge Johansson – bass guitar, backing vocals
Atom Willard – drums

References

Against Me! albums
2015 live albums